is a Japanese footballer who plays as a forward for Tegevajaro Miyazaki, on loan from Gamba Osaka.

Club career
Minamino made his professional debut in a 1–0 J1 League match against Kashiwa Reysol.

On 13 January 2023, Minamino was loaned out to J3 club, Tegevajaro Miyazaki for ahead of 2023 season.

Career statistics

Club
.

Notes

References

External links

2004 births
Living people
Japanese footballers
Japan youth international footballers
Association football forwards
J1 League players
J3 League players
Gamba Osaka players
Tegevajaro Miyazaki players